The Rwanda mole-rat (Tachyoryctes splendens) is a species of rodent in the family Spalacidae found in Burundi, the Democratic Republic of the Congo, and Rwanda. Its natural habitats are subtropical or tropical moist montane forests, subtropical or tropical high-altitude grassland, arable land, pastureland, plantations, rural gardens, and heavily degraded former forest.

Some taxonomic authorities consider it to be conspecific with the East African mole-rat.

References

Tachyoryctes
Mammals described in 1925
Taxonomy articles created by Polbot